Treesa Jolly (born 27 May 2003) is an Indian badminton player. She trains in the Gopichand Badminton Academy.

Achievements

Commonwealth Games 

Women's doubles

BWF World Tour (1 title, 2 runners-up) 
The BWF World Tour, which was announced on 19 March 2017 and implemented in 2018, is a series of elite badminton tournaments sanctioned by the Badminton World Federation (BWF). The BWF World Tour is divided into levels of World Tour Finals, Super 1000, Super 750, Super 500, Super 300 (part of the HSBC World Tour), and the BWF Tour Super 100.

Women's doubles

Mixed doubles

BWF International Challenge/Series (1 title, 3 runners-up) 
Women's doubles

  BWF International Challenge tournament
  BWF International Series tournament
  BWF Future Series tournament

BWF Junior International (2 titles, 2 runners-up) 
Girls' singles

Girls' doubles

Mixed doubles

  BWF Junior International Grand Prix tournament
  BWF Junior International Challenge tournament
  BWF Junior International Series tournament
  BWF Junior Future Series tournament

References

External links
 

Living people
2003 births
People from Kannur district
Racket sportspeople from Kerala
Sportswomen from Kerala
Indian female badminton players
Badminton players at the 2022 Commonwealth Games
Commonwealth Games silver medallists for India
Commonwealth Games bronze medallists for India
Commonwealth Games medallists in badminton
21st-century Indian women
Medallists at the 2022 Commonwealth Games
Indian national badminton champions